Jeanne d'Arc is an 1874 French gilded bronze equestrian sculpture of Joan of Arc by Emmanuel Frémiet. The outdoor statue is prominently displayed in the Place des Pyramides in Paris.

History 
The original statue was commissioned by the French government after the defeat of the country in the 1870 Franco-Prussian War. It is the only public commission of the state from 1870 to 1914, called the Golden Age of statuary in Paris, the other statues were funded by private subscriptions.

The sculptor took as his model Aimée Girod (1856–1937), a young woman from Domrémy, Joan of Arc's village in Lorraine.

The statue was inaugurated in 1874. The pedestal was designed by the architect Paul Abadie.

The artist, who made another version of the monument for the city of Nancy in 1889, replaced the horse of the Parisian monument 10 years later by a copy of the smaller Nancy one, which earned him criticism.

The monument was classified as a historic monument on March 31, 1992.

Reviving a tradition from the far-right leagues, on every May Day, the National Front holds an annual ceremony in her honour at the statue.

Locations 

The original work is located at the Place des Pyramides, in Paris, near where Joan of Arc was wounded during her failed attempt to take Paris.

Other copies can be seen at:
 Nancy, France,
 New Orleans,
 Philadelphia,
 Portland, Oregon (Joan of Arc),
 Melbourne, Australia.

Gallery

See also
 List of public art in Philadelphia
 Joan of Arc (Dubois)

References

External links 
 

1899 sculptures
Cultural depictions of Joan of Arc
Equestrian statues in Australia
Equestrian statues in France
Equestrian statues in Louisiana
Equestrian statues in Philadelphia
Outdoor sculptures in Philadelphia
Sculptures of women
Sculptures of women in Australia
Sculptures of women in France
Sculptures of women in Louisiana
Sculptures of women in Pennsylvania
Statues of military officers
Works about Joan of Arc